Hear No Evil is an EP by Australian heavy metal band Lord. It was released in a limited edition of 500 hand numbered CDs on October 31, 2008 on the band's own label, Dominus Records.

Overview

The EP featured two new songs, "Hear No Evil" and "Set in Stone", the second of which became the title track of the band's third album in early 2009. "Through the Fire" and "Going Down" are live versions of tracks from Ascendence recorded during a tour with Nightwish earlier in the year. "On a Night Like This" is a cover of a song that was a #1 hit for Kylie Minogue in September 2000.

Track listing
 All tracks by (Grose/Yatras) except where indicated

Personnel

 Lord Tim – vocals, guitars, keyboards
 Tim Yatras – backing vocals, drums
 Andrew Dowling – backing vocals, bass guitar
 Mark Furtner - backing vocals, guitar

with

 Tania Moran – backing vocals tracks #2 and #3

2008 EPs
Lord (band) albums